= Duquesne University School of Leadership and Professional Advancement =

Former school of Duquesne University

The School of Leadership and Professional Advancement was a constituent school of Duquesne University in Pittsburgh, Pennsylvania. Established in 2001, it offered accelerated undergraduate and graduate programs intended primarily for adult and nontraditional students. Its degree offerings included a Bachelor of Science in Professional Studies and a Master of Science in Leadership.

By 2021, Duquesne had merged the school's programs into other academic schools as part of a series of cost-saving measures.
